Vama is a rural municipality of 3,844 inhabitants situated in Satu Mare County, in the historical region of Transylvania, Romania. It is composed of a single village, Vama.

Vama Pottery

Vama commune maintains a tradition of pottery work. The local tradition is very old; the documents from the commune's archives confirm pottery workshops being in existence since the beginning of the 19th century.

Demographics
Ethnic groups (2002 census): 
Romanians: 70%
Hungarians: 27%
Romany (Gypsies): 2%

References

Communes in Satu Mare County